The Order of Excellence for Women or Order of Distinction is a state decoration of Sudan established on 16 November 1961 during Ibrahim Abboud's military government. It is awarded to Sudanese and foreign women who perform excellent services to the state or humanity.

It is not permissible to repeat awarding of decorations and medals, or to rise from one class to a higher one, except after the lapse of at least three years from the date of awarding them. This period is reduced to one year for employees if they are referred to retirement. Orders and medals remain the property of the awardee, and their heirs as a souvenir without any of them having the right to carry it. Without prejudice to any other punishment stipulated in the laws of Sudan, it is permissible, by order of the President of the Republic, to strip the bearer of a necklace, sash, medal, medallion, cloak of honour, or belt if they commit an act that is dishonourable or inconsistent with loyalty to the state.

Insignia

Notable recipients 

 2001 Rajaa Al-Badri
 2010 Egbal Jaafar
 2010 Layla Musa Ali
 2010 Sayda Al-Hajj Mohamed Bashir
 2010 Layla Al-Toum Abdul-Raziq
 2010 Fatima Abdallah Tairab
 2010 Layla Khalid Hashi
 2013 Griselda El Tayib
 2014 
 2014 Nawal Al-Humoud Al-Malek Al-Sabah
 2015 Hania Morsi Fadl
 2015 Zubaida Adam Musa Ibrahim
 2017 
 2017 Awadiya Samak
 2020 Nafisa Mohamed Mahmoud
 2022 Fatima bint Mubarak Al Ketbi

References 
Awards established in 1961
Orders, decorations, and medals of Sudan